Spinal Tap may refer to:
Spinal tap (medical procedure), a procedure in which a needle is inserted into the spinal canal
This Is Spinal Tap, 1984 mockumentary about a fictional heavy metal band
Spinal Tap (band), the fictional band from the film